Tshikota is a township just west outside Louis Trichardt in Vhembe District Municipality in the Limpopo province of South Africa.

References

Populated places in the Makhado Local Municipality
Townships in Limpopo

DURING FORCEFULL REMOVAL, People where moved According to Trabes ,
Tsongas Where Moved to Waterfall, Venda Speaking to Vleifontain And Most Sotho or Pedi Speaking Moved To Matocks.